Claire Pontlevoy (born 17 November 2003) is a retired French artistic gymnast. She was part of the French team at the 2019 World Artistic Gymnastics Championships.

Competitive History

References

External links 
 

2003 births
Living people
French female artistic gymnasts
People from Kourou
21st-century French women